Dulce Quental (born 13 April 1960) is a Brazilian singer and composer.

Biography 
Quental was born in Rio de Janeiro.  She was the singer of the band Sempre Livre in the early 1980s, and recorded her first solo disc, Délica, in 1985.  She sings pop music, jazz and bossa nova. In 1987, she recorded Voz Azul, produced by Herbert Vianna (who offers her as a gift the song Caleidoscópio).

In 1988 her third solo album, Dulce Quental, with songs by Arnaldo Antunes and Roberto Frejat (Onde Mora o Amor), by Arrigo Barnabé (Numa Praia do Brasil), by Itamar Assumpção (Mulher Dividida), by Cazuza by George Israel (Inocência do Prazer) and by Humberto Gessinger (Terra de Gigantes).

She composed songs to be sung by Nico Rezende, Leila Pinheiro, Capital Inicial, Daúde, and other singers. After fifteen years without appearing live or recording, she released a new album, Beleza Roubada, which was critically acclaimed.

Discography 
 2005 — Anos 80: Multishow ao Vivo (CD/DVD)
 2004 — Beleza Roubada, Cafezinho/Sony CD
 2001 — Dulce Quental Série Para Sempre, EMI CD
 1988 — Dulce Quental, EMI-Odeon LP
 1987 — Voz Azul, EMI-Odeon LP
 1986 — Délica, EMI-Odeon LP
 1984 — Avião de combate, (com o Sempre Livre) LP

See also 
 Música popular brasileira

References

External links 

 Dulce Quental at Discogs

Brazilian composers
Musicians from Rio de Janeiro (city)
21st-century Brazilian women singers
21st-century Brazilian singers
Brazilian contraltos
1960 births
Living people
20th-century Brazilian women singers
20th-century Brazilian singers